Jarmo Heikki Kullervo Rantanen (born 20 June 1944, Orivesi) is a Finnish politician from the Social Democratic Party.

He was elected as the city manager of Tampere in 1985 until he retired in the end of 2006. Additionally he served as the Minister of the Interior in the Holkeri cabinet from 1987 to 1991.

References 

1944 births
Social Democratic Party of Finland politicians
Living people
People from Orivesi
Ministers of the Interior of Finland
Mayors of places in Finland